= Kampughat mine =

Magnesium mine in Sagarmatha Zone, Nepal

- Location: Sagarmatha Zone, Nepal
- Products: Magnesium

The Kampughat mine is one of the largest magnesium mines in Nepal and in the world. The mine is located in the east of the country in the Sagarmatha Zone. The mine has estimated reserves of 20 million tonnes of ore 30% magnesium.
